Vexillum diutenerum is a species of small sea snail, marine gastropod mollusk in the family Costellariidae, the ribbed miters.

Description
The length of the shell attains 15 mm.

Distribution
This marine species occurs off Lifou Island, New Caledonia.

References

External links
  Cate, J.M. (1963). Revision of Dall's Hawaiian mitrids with descriptions of three new species (Mollusca: Gastropoda). The Veliger. 6(1): 23-43, pls 5-8

diutenerum
Gastropods described in 1897